Para is a village in Hilauli block of Unnao district, Uttar Pradesh, India. As of 2011, its population is 7,701, in 1,262 households, and it has 6 primary schools and no healthcare facilities. It hosts a regular market and has a sub post office.

The 1961 census recorded Para as comprising 16 hamlets, with a total population of 3,252 (1,660 male and 1,592 female), in 600 households and 433 physical houses. The area of the village was given as 4,181 acres. It had a post office then.

References

Villages in Unnao district